Karl Göran “Kalle” Söderström (born October 26, 1985) is a Swedish football player who plays for Varbergs GIF.

Career
Between 2009 and 2011, Söderström played for Höganäs BK. He scored 12 goals in 19 matches for the club in Division 3 2009. The 2010 season made Söderström 12 goals in 20 matches. In 2011, he scored nine goals in 14 matches.

In August 2011, Söderström was recruited by Varbergs BoIS. In November 2011, the contract was extended by two years. In November 2013, he again extended the contract by two years. In December 2015, Söderström extended the contract by one year. In January 2017, he extended his contract for another year.

Prior to the 2018 season, he signed a two-year contract with Falkenbergs FF. On March 31, 2019 Soderstrom made his Allsvenskan debut for Falkenbergs against Örebro SK. In December 2021 he was signed by Varbergs GIF.

References

1985 births
Living people
Swedish footballers
Association football forwards
Varbergs BoIS players
Falkenbergs FF players
Ettan Fotboll players
Superettan players
Allsvenskan players